Andrew Otis is an American author and journalist. Otis is considered an expert on journalism and the early print history of Bengal.

He wrote Hicky's Bengal Gazette: the Untold Story of India's First Newspaper which details the story of James Augustus Hicky and Hicky's Bengal Gazette's struggle for a free press in 18th century India. It received positive reviews and was listed as one of the best books of the year by the Asian Review of Books.

Hicky's Bengal Gazette: the Untold Story of India's First Newspaper is the product of five years of work, including two years of research.

He currently resides in Washington, D.C.

References

American writers
Living people
1989 births
People from Lexington, Kentucky